"Anapnoi Anatoli" (Greek: Αναπνοή Ανατολή; English: Breaths from the east) is a popular CD single from popular Greek artist Glykeria. It was released in December 1997 by Sony Music Greece and was a precursor to her successful 1998 album Maska.

Track listing

1998 singles
Glykeria songs
Greek-language songs
1998 songs